Sassolino, sometimes called Sassolino di Modena, is an anise-flavored liqueur from Sassuolo, Italy.  Its flavor is derived from star anise.

History

This liqueur first appeared in 1804 when a Swiss named Bazzingher from the Graubünden Canton, together with a number of fellow countrymen, most of whom were grocers or spice sellers, moved to Sassuolo, Modena and subsequently began producing an aniseed flavored liqueur.  The company then changed hands a number of times before the Stampa family acquired it and put the liqueur into mass production.

The liqueur is 40% vol.

References
Official Website

Anise liqueurs and spirits
Italian liqueurs
Sassuolo
1804 introductions